Wyryki-Kolonia  is a village in Włodawa County, Lublin Voivodeship, in eastern Poland. It is the seat of the gmina (administrative district) called Gmina Wyryki.

The village has a population of 397.

References

Wyryki-Kolonia